Fernand Massay (20 December 1919 – 13 December 2010) was a Belgian footballer. He played in five matches for the Belgium national football team from 1945 to 1947.

References

External links
 

1919 births
2010 deaths
Belgian footballers
Belgium international footballers
Place of birth missing
Association footballers not categorized by position